The Action Figure is the second album by Christian rapper Knowdaverbs, released in 2000.

Track listing
 "God Is Big""
 "Phullon Empty
 "Just The Facts Ma'am" (feat. GRITS & Jason Eskridge)
 "Action Figure"
 "Plane Scared"
 "How Excellent" (feat. Andrea Kimmey-Baca of Out of Eden)
 "If I were Mayor"
 "Re-enter the System" (feat. The Advocates)
 "Jericho Sounds" (feat. Factors of the Seven)
 "Me & My Mic, Stu And His Fish" (feat. Ranya Stewart)
 "What Do You Think Of That?"
 "Zombies" (feat. 4th Avenue Jones)
 "Til' Morning" (feat. The Katinas)
 "Figurative Language" (feat. DJ Maj & DJ Form)

Reviews

2000 albums
Verbs (rapper) albums